Jamie Draven (born Jamie Donnelly on 14 May 1978) is an English actor whose career in films and television began in 1998. One of his early notable parts was as Billy's bullying older brother, Tony, in the hit 2000 film Billy Elliot and as Jamie Dow in Ultimate Force.

Biography
A native of the southern Manchester district of Wythenshawe, Draven is the youngest of three boys. Early in life he thought of becoming a footballer but he turned his attention to acting at 16. He later moved to London to fulfill his acting ambitions, although he had no theatrical training and no CV. Changing his name to Jamie Draven, he was 19 with just a few small parts to his credit when he won a major role in the 1999 Granada Television drama Butterfly Collectors.

He has worked with actress Alex Reid on several occasions, including Series 1 and 2 of Ultimate Force, Episode 2 of Mobile and in Jetsam.

Filmography

Films

TV

External links

Living people
1978 births
People from Wythenshawe
English male film actors
English male television actors
Male actors from Manchester